Tommy Burden (21 February 1924 – 2001) was an English professional footballer who made over 500 league appearances for four teams over a twenty-year career.

Career
Burden played for Wolverhampton Wanderers, Chester, Leeds United – where he was club captain from 1949 to 1954 – and Bristol City. He participated in the Normandy Landings, where he was injured.

External links

Player profile at LeedsFans.org

1924 births
2001 deaths
English footballers
Wolverhampton Wanderers F.C. players
Chester City F.C. players
Leeds United F.C. players
Bristol City F.C. players
English Football League players
Association football midfielders